Risto Siltanen (born October 31, 1958) is a Finnish former professional ice hockey defenceman. He played eight seasons in the National Hockey League for the Edmonton Oilers, Hartford Whalers and Quebec Nordiques.

Career statistics

Regular season and playoffs

International

Awards and honors
All-Star Selection, 1977 and 1978 IIHF world junior hockey championships

References

External links 

1958 births
Edmonton Oilers players
Edmonton Oilers (WHA) players
Finnish expatriate ice hockey people in Switzerland
Finnish ice hockey defencemen
Fredericton Express players
Hartford Whalers players
Ilves players
Living people
People from Mänttä-Vilppula
Quebec Nordiques players
SC Bern players
SC Bietigheim-Bissingen players
St. Louis Blues draft picks
TuTo players
Sportspeople from Pirkanmaa